The history of the United States from 2008 to the present began with the collapse of the housing bubble, which led to the Great Recession. The resulting economic downturn and general discontent led Barack Obama to win the presidential election in 2008, becoming the country's first African-American president. Obama's domestic agenda notably included economic stimulus packages and the Affordable Care Act. 2011 saw the formal end to the Iraq War as well as the killing of Al-Qaeda leader Osama bin Laden. The War on Terror continued with a shift in attention toward the Islamic State in the 2010s.

Increased political polarization present during Obama's presidency led to a contentious election for president in 2016 which saw businessman Donald Trump defeat former Secretary of State Hillary Clinton. Trump ran on a populist message, enacting tax cuts, immigration restrictions, attempting to "Build a Wall" on the US–Mexico border, and an "America First" foreign policy. In December 2019, the Democratic-controlled House of Representatives voted to pass articles of impeachment against Trump for his role in a scandal involving Ukraine. In the 2020 presidential election, Joe Biden defeated Trump, who (along with his supporters) made multiple attempts to overturn the election results, which included an attack on the United States Capitol on January 6, 2021. The attack and Trump's involvement led to his second impeachment. Biden has overseen the lasting effects of the COVID-19 pandemic as well as the end to the War in Afghanistan and the trade war with China.

Conflicts

War in Afghanistan

The War in Afghanistan continued. In September 2008, President Bush announced he would shift 4,500 US Armed Forces troops from Iraq to the conflict in Afghanistan. This was followed with recently elected President Barack Obama announcing in February 2009 that the United States would deploy an additional 17,000 troops to Afghanistan. The Obama administration also later announced a "troop surge" of an additional 30,000 US military forces to be deployed in the summer of 2010, and to begin withdrawals of the 100,000 total US troops in July 2011. With the surge in effect, the NATO-led International Security Assistance Force (ISAF) launched Operation Moshtarak, an offensive determined to eliminate Taliban insurgents from Helmand Province. At 15,000 troops, it was the largest joint operation of the war.

After a 2010 profile on US Army general and ISAF Commander Stanley McChrystal was published in the magazine Rolling Stone, McChrystal was forced to resign from his position after making controversial remarks about Obama administration officials. President Obama then announced ISAF to be commanded by General David Petraeus.

On May 1, 2011, President Barack Obama announced that the US conducted an operation that killed al-Qaeda leader Osama bin Laden at his compound in Abbottabad, Pakistan. The announcement drew worldwide praise, with spontaneous celebrations at Ground Zero, Times Square, and outside of the White House. The raid on bin Laden's compound in Abbottabad led to a rise in diplomatic tensions between the US and Pakistan. With civilian deaths from the United States' drone program in so-called "signature strikes", the 2011 NATO attack in Pakistan, which led to the deaths of 24 Pakistani military officers, and the closure of NATO supply lines to neighboring Afghanistan, Pakistan–United States relations remain fractured as a result of the War on Terror.

In mid-2011 Obama announced the start of the withdrawal of the additional 33,000 troops deployed from the 2010 troop surge. By December 2011, the first round of 10,000 troops were withdrawn, with the second round of 23,000 troops later withdrawn in September 2012.

As of February 2014, a total of 2,307 US troops were killed and 19,656 injured due to the Afghanistan War. Estimates from the Costs of Wars Project based at Brown University's Watson Institute for International Studies also suggest that between 16,725 and 19,013 Afghan civilians died as a result of the war.

The International Security Assistance Force ceased combat operations and was disbanded in December 2014, with a small number of troops remaining behind in an advisory role as part of ISAF's successor organization, the Resolute Support Mission.

On April 13, 2021, President Joe Biden announced his plan to withdraw all troops from Afghanistan by September 11, 2021, this date being the twentieth anniversary of the September 11 Attacks.
The date for US troops to withdraw from Afghanistan was moved forward to August 31. The withdrawal of US soldiers and other foreign soldiers coincided with the 2021 Taliban offensive, where the Taliban defeated the Afghan Armed Forces culminating with the fall of Kabul on August 15, 2021. On the same day, the president of Afghanistan Ashraf Ghani fled to Tajikistan and the Taliban declared victory and the war had ended. Following a massive airlift of more than 120,000 people, the US military mission in Afghanistan ended on August 30, 2021.

Iraq War 

As the situation in Iraq became increasingly difficult and deadly, policymakers began looking for new options. This led to the formation of the Iraq Study Group, a nonpartisan commission chaired by James Baker and Lee H. Hamilton. This produced a variety of proposals; some of the more notable ones were to seek decreased US presence in Iraq, increased engagement with neighboring countries, and greater attention to resolving other local conflicts, such as the Israeli–Palestinian conflict. The recommendations were generally ignored, and instead, President Bush ordered a surge of troops to Iraq in 2007 and 2008. Violence in the country declined in 2008 and 2009, and the US combat role ended in August 2010. US forces were withdrawn in large numbers in 2009 and 2010, and the war was declared formally over in December 2011.

Crime and violence

Continuing the increase in high-profile mass school shootings seen in the late 1990s and 2000s, additional school shootings shocked the country in the 2010s and 2020s, the deadliest of which were the Oikos University shooting, the Sandy Hook Elementary School shooting (both in 2012), the Isla Vista killings, the Umpqua Community College shooting (2015), the Stoneman Douglas High School shooting, the Santa Fe High School shooting (both in 2018), and the Robb Elementary School shooting (2022). These shootings, particularly the Sandy Hook, Stoneman Douglas, and Robb shootings, heightened the debate over gun politics, and continued the public dialogue about improving mental health care and school safety.

In November 2009, US Army major Nidal Malik Hasan killed 13 fellow soldiers and injured 30 in the Fort Hood shooting in Killeen, Texas. While the act was called terrorism by some due to Hasan's Muslim heritage, the attack was ruled out by the FBI to have been perpetrated by a terrorist organization. On September 16, 2013, another mass murder on a US military base surpassed the incident when a former navy reservist fired a shotgun at the Washington Navy Yard Shooting, killing 12 civilian contractors and injured four more at the headquarters of the Naval Sea Systems Command (NAVSEA) in Southeast Washington, D.C.

On January 8, 2011, US Representative Gabby Giffords was the target of an assassination attempt, when a gunman went on a shooting spree, critically injuring Giffords, killing federal judge John Roll and five other people, and wounding 14 others.

On July 20, 2012, a man shot 70 people (up to that time, the highest number of victims of any mass shooting in American history) at a movie theater in Aurora, Colorado, killing 12 and injuring 58 others.

On October 1, 2017, the Orlando incident was surpassed by the 2017 Las Vegas shooting as the deadliest mass shooting in American history when a gunman fired from his 32nd-floor hotel room of the Mandalay Bay onto a crowd of concertgoers at the Route 91 Harvest music festival, killing 58 and injuring 869 others before committing suicide. This shooting led to increased dialogue and debate over gun control, particularly the use of bump stocks which allowed the shooter to fire his semi-automatic rifle at a rate similar to a fully automatic weapon. Concerns about public event safety and hotel security also became a focus of public dialogue in the wake of this event. In addition, the investigation was the focus of intense scrutiny, particularly as the official reports and timelines changed several times throughout the investigation. This also led to a number of conspiracy theories.

However, the following month on November 5, a former and troubled USAF soldier killed 26 churchgoers at the First Baptist Church in Sutherland Springs church shooting. It was the worst mass shooting that occurred in both the State of Texas and at an American place of worship in modern history, surpassing the Charleston church shooting of 2015 and the Waddell Buddhist temple shooting of 1991. The Pittsburgh Synagogue shooting of 2018 and also led to major debates on weapon control and brought attention to gaps in reporting to the federal background-check system intended to ban convicted domestic abusers.

Hate crimes

After a decrease and legislation toughening laws in the 2000s, the late 2010s saw a rise in hate crimes. Hate crimes became the motive of many mass shootings, with race, sexual orientation, and religion becoming prominent targets.

On June 12, 2016, a mass shooting in a Florida gay nightclub killed 50 people, including the man responsible for it. It surpassed 2007's Virginia Tech shooting as the deadliest mass shooting in American history, and was also classified as a terrorist attack and a hate crime against the LGBT community. A rise in attacks and killings of transgender individuals also occurred, with attention on underreporting in both statistics and media attention. The Anthony Avalos killing and a 2022 mass shooting in Colorado Springs have continually brought renewed attention to attacks against the LGBT community.

On October 27, 2018, a gunman opened fire at the Tree of Life synagogue during Shabbat morning services, killing 11 people and injuring six more. The attack was the deadliest ever against the Jewish community in America; many of those killed had been Holocaust survivors. The shooting brought awareness to an increase in antisemitism.

Hate crimes based on race continued to be the leading motive. White supremacy attacks against black Americans garnered significant public attention, as did increasing attacks on Americans of Mexican descent and Americans of Asian descent. Examples include the 2019 El Paso shooting, 2022 Buffalo shooting,and an increase in Anti-Asian attacks during the COVID-19 pandemic.

Domestic terrorism

Concurrently to the rise in mass shootings, the late 2010s saw a sharp increase in domestic terror incidents. Several studies attributed this rise to an increase in attacks from groups with links to far right-wing extremism, religious extremism, and white supremacy.

On April 15, 2013, two bombs exploded near the finish line of the Boston Marathon in Boston, Massachusetts, killing three people and injuring over 280. Three days later, suspects Tamerlan and Dzhokhar Tsarnaev led the Boston Police Department on a high speed chase, after killing one officer at the Massachusetts Institute of Technology. Tamerlan was killed in a shootout with police and a seriously injured Dzhokhar was taken into custody in nearby Watertown the following day.

On December 2, 2015, in the 2015 San Bernardino attack, 14 people were killed and 22 were injured in a mass shooting at a workplace Christmas party at the Inland Regional Center in San Bernardino, California. Both a workplace shooting and a terrorist attack, the incident was perpetrated by Rizwan Farook, a healthcare worker who was employed at the facility, and his wife Tashfeen Malik. The pair were US citizens of Pakistani descent who had become radicalized and had expressed a commitment to jihadism prior to the attack. The attack also included an attempted bombing. Four hours after the attack, the perpetrators were killed by police in a shootout that left two officers injured.

In late October 2018, 16 packages containing pipe bombs were mailed via the US Postal Service to several prominent critics of US President Donald Trump, including leading Democratic Party politicians such as former US President Barack Obama, former US Vice President Joe Biden, and former US Secretary of State Hillary Clinton, as well as CNN offices in New York City. On March 21, 2019, Cesar Sayoc, 57, pleaded guilty to 65 felony charges related to the bombing, including using weapons of mass destruction and domestic terrorism.

2020 was marked by a rise in domestic terrorist threats and widespread conspiracy theories around mail-in voting and COVID-19. The QAnon conspiracy theory, a fringe far-right political movement among conservatives, gained publicity. Multiple major cities were hit by rioting and brawls between far-left antifascist affiliated groups and far right groups such as the Proud Boys. In March 2021, FBI director Christopher Wray confirmed an October 2020 report from the Department of Homeland Security that said white supremacists posed the top domestic terrorism threat. Wray noted that the threat from these groups had been elevated to the same level as ISIS.

On January 6, 2021, far-right extremist groups supporting Donald Trump's election conspiracy efforts stormed the United States Capitol while Congress was in session to confirm Biden's win. The storming was considered by many to be a domestic terror attack. The 2022 elections saw continued attempts of intimidation, and concern for attacks, at voting stations and election offices around the country.

Disasters

Natural disasters

In the spring of 2011, several major tornado outbreaks affected the Central and Southern United States. Forty-three people were killed in a tornado outbreak from April 14–16. Approximately 350+ people were killed in a tornado outbreak from April 25–28, the deadliest US tornado outbreak in 75 years (since the 1936 Tupelo-Gainesville tornado outbreak). States particularly hit hard by the outbreaks included Oklahoma, Arkansas, Mississippi, Tennessee, Georgia, North Carolina, Virginia, and most especially, Alabama, which sustained over 250 fatalities alone. The latter outbreak produced $10 billion in damage, making it the costliest tornado outbreak in history. On May 22, an EF5 tornado devastated Joplin, Missouri, killing 154, injuring over 1,000 people, and causing $1–3 billion in damage, making it the deadliest single US tornado in 64 years and the costliest single tornado of all time.

In August 2011, Hurricane Irene was the first hurricane to make landfall since Ike in 2008, striking the Eastern Seaboard of the United States, making landfalls in North Carolina, New Jersey, and New York. The storm killed at least 45 people and caused $10 billion in damage. The storm was particularly notable for its extensive flooding in the Northeast, and a couple days later, Tropical Storm Lee made landfall in Louisiana, its remnants tracking to the Northeast for even more devastating floods.

In October 2012, Hurricane Sandy struck the East Coast of the United States, making landfall near Atlantic City, New Jersey. The storm knocked out power to millions of people and caused flooding in parts of New York City along with devastation to the Jersey Shore and portions of Long Island and Staten Island. The storm has been blamed for 121 fatalities and is estimated to have caused at least $50 billion in damage.

In May 2013, at least 24 people were killed, 377 people were injured, and $1.5 to $3 billion in damage was caused when an EF5 tornado struck the Oklahoma City suburb of Moore, which was hit by a deadly and destructive F5 tornado only 14 years prior.

In August 2017, Hurricane Harvey became the first major hurricane to make landfall in the United States since Hurricane Wilma in 2005. It devastated Houston, Texas, causing extreme flooding, 83 confirmed deaths, and an estimated $70 billion to $200 billion in damage. Harvey's highest winds hit 130 mph.

In September, Hurricane Irma hit Florida, killing 102 people and causing over $62.87 billion in damage, making it unofficially the fourth-costliest hurricane on record. The size of the storm spanned across the entire Florida peninsula, and all 67 counties of Florida declared a state of emergency. Irma's highest winds were 185 mph. Later that month, Hurricane Maria hit Puerto Rico, a US territory, killing over 547 people and causing over $91.6 billion in damage, making it the third-costliest Atlantic hurricane on record. Maria's highest winds were 175 mph.

On September 14, 2018, Hurricane Florence hit North Carolina as a Category 1 Hurricane, causing major flooding. 39 deaths were counted and damage is estimated as $17 billion (2018 USD). Florence's highest winds were 140 mph. On October 10, Hurricane Michael struck the Florida Panhandle as a Category 5 storm with 160 mph winds after undergoing rapid intensification just prior to landfall; it killed 45 people in the US and caused $15 billion in damage.

In November of that year, several wildfires devastated portions of California, most notably the Camp Fire in Butte County in Northern California, which burned over 150,000 acres and destroyed nearly 19,000 structures. With a death toll of 86 and damages up to $10 billion, it was the deadliest and most destructive wildfire in California history and the deadliest US wildfire since 1918.

A series of earthquakes struck Southern California on July 4 and 5, 2019. A magnitude 6.4 earthquake, a foreshock, struck near the desert city of Ridgecrest, on July 4. On July 5, a 7.1 earthquake struck, the main shock, centered near the first. The latter was the largest earthquake to hit Southern California in 20 years. Relatively minor damage resulted from the initial foreshock, though some building fires were reported in Ridgecrest near the epicenter. Effects were felt across much of Southern California as well as parts of Arizona and Nevada, as far north as the San Francisco Bay Area and Sacramento, and as far south as Baja California, Mexico. An estimated 20 million people experienced the foreshock, and approximately 30 million people experienced the mainshock.

Other disasters

On April 20, 2010, an offshore oil drilling rig, the Deepwater Horizon, exploded and burned off the coast of Louisiana in the Gulf of Mexico. Dozens of workers fled the flames and were rescued by lifeboats and helicopters, however 11 were killed and 17 were injured in the incident. The rig burned for 36 hours before sinking. On April 24, it was discovered that a damaged wellhead was leaking oil into the Gulf of Mexico at a rapid rate. For approximately 90 days, tens of thousands of barrels of oil leaked into the ocean every day, resulting in the largest oil spill in United States history. The wellhead was successfully contained in mid-July, stopping the flow, and efforts are ongoing to cap the wellhead and create a replacement well. Despite significant efforts to protect coastlines, the spill has had devastating impacts on the environment and the economies of the Gulf Coast states. The Obama administration has ordered well operator BP responsible for all cleanup costs, which are expected to run in the tens of billions of dollars. The spill has resulted in negative public approval ratings of the US government, the Obama administration, and BP, for their handling of the spill, with BP suffering the worst ratings.

Religion

A 2014 Religious Landscape Study conducted by Pew Research Center from June 4 to September 30, 2014, found Christianity declined 7.8% from 78.4% in 2007 to 70.6% in 2014, unaffiliated rose 6.7% from 16.1% in 2007 to 22.8% in 2014, and non-Christian religions rose 1.2% from 4.7% in 2007 to 5.9% in 2014.

Politics

The Great Recession

In 2007, while US unemployment dropped to its lowest level since the year 2000, the housing bubble reached its peak and economic growth slowed down, and by December 2007, the United States entered the severe long-lasting Great Recession. By mid-2008, property values and the values of other assets plummeted, and the stock market crashed in October 2008, spurred by a lack of investor confidence as the liquidity of assets began to evaporate. With the decline in wealth and the lack of investor and consumer confidence, growth and economic activity came to a screeching halt and the job growth of previous years was soon wiped out, with mass layoffs and unemployment rising rapidly in late 2008, and continuing into 2009.

Federal Reserve chairman Ben Bernanke told a federal commission in November 2009, "As a scholar of the Great Depression, I honestly believe that September and October of 2008 was the worst financial crisis in global history, including the Great Depression." Of the 13 most important US financial institutions, "12 were at risk of failure within a period of a week or two".

The Federal Reserve and the Treasury cooperated by pouring trillions into a financial system that had frozen up worldwide. They rescued many of the large financial corporations from bankruptcy – with the exception of Lehman Brothers, which went bankrupt – and took government control of insurance giant AIG, mortgage banks Fannie Mae and Freddie Mac, and both General Motors and Chrysler.

In October 2008, Bush sought, and Congress passed, the Emergency Economic Stabilization Act of 2008 (commonly referred to as the "bank bailout") with the goal of protecting the US financial system from complete collapse in the wake of the late-2000s recession, which brought significant declines in the stock market. The bill provided federal government guarantees of up to $700 billion to troubled financial institutions through the Troubled Asset Relief Program (TARP). By 2010, only a fraction of that money was ever spent, as banks were able to quickly repay loans from the federal government or ended up never needing the money.

Meanwhile, unemployment doubled to nearly 10%, with states such as California and Michigan especially hard hit. While the stock market rebounded by 2011, and corporate profits had recovered, unemployment remained over 9% into 2011. The recession was worldwide, with Europe and Japan hard hit, while China, India and Canada fared much better.

The Obama administration

The nation went into the 2008 election cycle having a Republican president and Democratic Congress both with extremely low approval ratings. New York Senator Hillary Clinton had the inside track for the nomination but faced an unexpected challenge from Barack Obama, the nearly unknown junior Senator from Illinois. The GOP nominated Arizona Senator John McCain. During the general election, Obama's youthfulness, charisma, and widespread media support proved effective against McCain, seen as a stodgy Washington insider. In addition, his relatively advanced age (72) and injuries from captivity in the Vietnam War drew doubts over his health and stamina. Overall disillusionment with the Republican Party and George Bush's administration did not help McCain's cause, and his choice of Alaska governor Sarah Palin as his running mate also drew some controversy. Obama also drew some doubts over his inexperience and controversial associations with Weather Underground founder William Ayers and Reverend Jeremiah Wright, the pastor of an African-American church Obama had attended for years who was discovered to have made anti-white sermons. The decisive event was the collapse of the national financial system over the summer, launching a severe worldwide depression  On November 4, 2008, Obama defeated McCain 365 to 173 in the electoral vote and 52.9% to 45.7% in the popular vote to become the 44th President of the United States, making history in becoming the first African American to be elected to the highest executive office. Part of the strong showing came from a surge of support from younger voters, African Americans, Hispanics and independents. Democrats made further gains in Congress, adding to the majorities they had won in 2006.

Obama's early policy decisions addressed a continuing global financial crisis and have included changes in tax policies, foreign policy initiatives and the phasing out of detention of prisoners at the Guantanamo Bay detention camp in Cuba. Within a few weeks of taking office, the new president and Congress passed the American Recovery and Reinvestment Act of 2009, which was ostensibly aimed at recovering from the economic collapse. This entailed a $700 billion stimulus package for the economy, although there were considerable questions over the amount of money spent or its actual effectiveness.

A domestic initiative passed by the 111th Congress and signed into law by President Obama was the Affordable Care Act, an important statute guaranteeing comprehensive medical coverage to all Americans, regardless of age, sex, pre-existing health conditions or ability to pay. The Don't Ask, Don't Tell Repeal Act, which allowed openly gay people to serve in the military, was enacted in 2010.

In foreign policy, President Obama withdrew US troops from Iraq in large numbers, bringing the Iraq War to an end in December 2011. At the same time, he also increased troop levels in the Afghanistan War. Early in his presidency, he successfully negotiated the New START treaty with the Russian Federation, which made significant reductions in their nuclear arsenals. The US also maintained ongoing talks, led by Secretary of State Hillary Clinton, with North Korea over its nuclear weapons program, as well as with Israel and the Palestinian Authority over a two-state solution to the Israeli–Palestinian conflict. In May 2011, President Obama announced in a televised speech to the nation that al-Qaeda leader and culprit behind many deadly acts of terrorism (including the September 11 attacks) Osama bin Laden was killed by US forces at a compound in Abbottabad, Pakistan.

Although the recession reached its bottom in June 2009 and began to move up again, voters remained frustrated with the slow pace of the economic recovery. In the spring of 2009, large protests erupted in Washington, DC from conservative groups who began calling themselves the "Tea Party" and who were particularly opposed to the controversial stimulus act. The Tea Party would end up in a few years as a springboard for a large-scale Republican revival. In the 2010 midterms, the GOP retook control of the House, although the Senate remained in Democratic hands.

Under the new Congress, which had a Republican House and a Democratic Senate, President Obama and Congress clashed for months over whether or not to raise the debt ceiling and whether or not to extend the payroll tax cuts for middle-income citizens that Obama signed into law. After months of heated debate, the debt ceiling was ultimately raised and the tax cuts extended. However, Obama's approval ratings continued to hover at around 46%, while Congress had an even lower approval rating of 11%.

In the 2012 presidential election, the GOP nominated former Massachusetts governor Mitt Romney. Much like John McCain four years earlier, Romney was largely seen as a tepid moderate and a Beltway insider who did not inspire the conservative base of the Republican Party, nor independents. He also drew controversy for his stand on Obamacare, which had been based on the system he implemented as Governor of Massachusetts. Obama defeated his opponent to win a second term, with a tally in the Electoral College by 332 to 206 and in the popular vote by 51.06% to 47.21%. The electoral map remained the same as 2008, with the exception of North Carolina and Indiana flipping back as red states, and the party balance in Congress remained largely unchanged.

In the November 2014 midterm elections, the Republican Party took control of the Senate and expanded its majority in the House of Representatives, an event that portended an ill omen for the Democrats.

On December 17, 2014, President Barack Obama announced a restoration of full diplomatic relations with Cuba for the first time since 1961. A deal between the United States and Cuba was brokered during 18 months of secret talks hosted by Canada, with a final meeting hosted by Pope Francis at the Vatican. Although the US embargo remains in effect and ordinary tourism by Americans is still prohibited, the United States will ease travel restrictions, release three Cuban spies, and open an embassy in Havana.

The New York Times reported in January 2015:

In short: The state of union, while far stronger than when Mr. Obama took office, remains troubled. The financial crisis has ended, with job growth picking up and the American economy among the world's strongest right now. Yet the great 21st-century wage slowdown continues, with pay raises for most workers still meager. In other positive news, the deficit has fallen sharply, thanks to a combination of slower health-cost growth and budget cuts (the latter championed by Republicans). Many more people have health insurance, thanks to Mr. Obama's health law. More people are graduating from college—although Mr. Obama is likely to fall short of his vow to have the United States lead the world in college graduates by 2020.On the negative side, climate change appears to be accelerating, creating serious health and economic risks. The fall in gasoline prices, though welcome for many struggling families, won't help the climate. And with Mr. Obama delivering his address the day after Martin Luther King's Birthday, it's also worth remembering that the country's racial divides remain deep, with African-Americans still far behind other Americans by many measures.

On June 26, 2015, the Supreme Court ruled, 5–4, in the case of Obergefell vs. Hodges that same-sex marriage was a constitutionally protected right under the 14th Amendment. Shortly before the ruling, polling showed the majority of Americans approving of same-sex marriage. The ruling was celebrated by many, and President Obama advertised his support for the ruling by coloring the White House in gay pride colors using lights. This ruling was not achieved without controversy, as it did little to change the minds of those that disapproved of homosexuality in general.

In regards to the Supreme Court, President Obama faced three vacancies during his administration. Justice David Souter retired in June 2009 and the president nominated as his replacement Sonia Sotomayor, the first Hispanic Supreme Court Justice in US history. Justice John Paul Stevens retired exactly one year later and Obama replaced him with Elena Kagan. Justice Antonin Scalia died on February 13, 2016. President Obama nominated Merrick Garland as his replacement, but the United States Senate, led by Republican Majority Leader Mitch McConnell refused to give Garland a hearing, instead arguing that the winner of the ongoing presidential election be given the opportunity to nominate Scalia's replacement instead. Justice Ruth Bader Ginsburg was pressured by liberal groups to retire while the Democrats remained in control of the White House, but declined to do so.

On September 25, 2015, John Boehner announced that he would step down as Speaker and resign from Congress at the end of October 2015. Boehner's resignation took place after Pope Francis' address to Congress the day before, an event considered by Boehner as a high point in his legislative career. Boehner was replaced by Republican Paul Ryan, the US representative for Wisconsin's 1st congressional district and former candidate for vice president along with Mitt Romney. Sources in Boehner's office indicated he was stepping aside in the face of increasing discord while trying to manage passage of a continuing resolution to fund the government. Conservative opposition to funding Planned Parenthood as part of the resolution, and stronger threats to Boehner's leadership on account of the controversy, prompted the abrupt announcement. Members of the caucus indicated that the resignation opened the way for a "clean bill" for government funding to pass, and "a commitment [was] made that there [would] be no shutdown."

The Trump administration

In the 2016 presidential election, the GOP had 17 candidates. The Democratic Party had fewer potential candidates to choose from, and the campaign early on centered on Hillary Clinton, former Secretary of State, United States Senator from New York, and First Lady of the United States. A surprise challenger to Clinton appeared in 74-year-old Vermont Senator Bernie Sanders, a self-identified democratic socialist and the one of only two independents in the Senate. Despite attracting a large, enthusiastic following among mostly young voters, Sanders was unable to secure the nomination. When the primary season finished in the spring, Clinton secured the Democratic nomination. Senator Bernie Sanders finally conceded the race, endorsing then presumptive nominee Hillary Clinton.

Meanwhile, in June 2015, real estate mogul Donald Trump announced that he was seeking the presidency. Although Trump's announcement received little attention at first (he had mounted a short-lived third-party presidential run in 2000), he quickly bounded out of the gate with a populist message about his perceived decline of American economic and geopolitical prestige under the previous two administrations. By the start of the primary season in early 2016, Trump was polling ahead of the other GOP candidates despite his lack of political experience and attracting a considerable following among the party base. By the spring of 2016, most GOP candidates had dropped out of the running and Trump had no remaining challengers other than Ted Cruz and John Kasich. Some right wing conservatives and Christian groups continued to support Cruz, especially as there was controversy over Trump's personal life and relatively liberal attitude on social issues. However, Trump's economic message had widespread populist appeal and on May 3, Ted Cruz officially ended his presidential campaign. John Kasich followed suit the following day. 
As the primaries gave way to the general election, Hillary Clinton faced numerous controversies over her tenure as Secretary of State, namely an email server scandal. Polls and surveys showed that both Clinton and Trump had an overall negative image among voters. Meanwhile, Donald Trump chose as his running mate Indiana Governor Mike Pence. Pence, a staunch conservative Christian, was seen as a way of winning over heartland conservatives, many of whom were Ted Cruz supporters wary of Trump's attitude on social issues. Clinton chose as her running mate Virginia Senator Tim Kaine, seen as a way of connecting with blue collar white voters, Trump's base of support.

During the general election, controversies over remarks Donald Trump had made over the years seen as demeaning to women came up, including a beauty pageant he had been a judge on in the 1990s where he had criticized the appearance of a contestant, as well as a leaked 2005 audio tape in which he made vulgar statements about the treatment of women. Hillary Clinton, however, continued to be embroiled in controversies of her own, the biggest being the revelation that she had used an unsecured private email server during her tenure as Secretary of State, leaving the possibility of having mismanaged or compromised classified documents. In addition, John Podesta, Clinton's campaign manager, had his private email account hacked, releasing over 20,000 campaign emails in October and November 2016 by WikiLeaks.

On Election Day, November 8, Trump carried 306 electoral votes against Clinton's 232. He made considerable inroads into the old Rust Belt, carrying states such as Michigan, Wisconsin and Pennsylvania that had been safe Democratic territory since 1988. However, Donald Trump did not win the popular vote. This was the fifth time in American history that the outcome of the Electoral College did not match the outcome of the popular vote, the others happening in 1824, 1876, 1888, and 2000. The GOP also retained control a majority in both the House of Representatives and the Senate, controlling all branches of government. Allegations of Russian interference on behalf of Trump's candidacy in the 2016 election caused controversy during and after the election.

On January 20, 2017, Trump took the oath of office as the 45th US president in the face of large-scale demonstrations from protesters unhappy with the outcome of the election and of the incoming president. On his first day in office, he undertook a series of executive orders aimed at dismantling the Affordable Care Act and Trans-Pacific Partnership, and also moved to pass a temporary ban on refugees from several Middle Eastern states. This last action met with widespread criticism, and the 9th Circuit Court of Appeals dismissed it as unconstitutional. On June 26, the Supreme Court overturned the 9th Circuit's decision, ruling that part of President Trump's executive order is constitutional. One of Trump's major accomplishments was nominating Associate Justice Neil Gorsuch to the Supreme Court. On April 10, Gorsuch was sworn in. In 2018, President Trump nominated Brett Kavanaugh to replace the departing Associate Justice Anthony Kennedy. The nomination process soon became contentious after several women, most notably Palo Alto University psychology professor Christine Blasey Ford, accused Kavanaugh of past instances of sexual assault. After a series of hearings, the US Senate voted to confirm Kavanaugh despite the controversy.

In December 2017, Congress passed and President Trump signed into law the Tax Cuts and Jobs Act of 2017. The Act amended the Internal Revenue Code of 1986 based on tax reform advocated by congressional Republicans and the Trump administration. Major elements include reducing tax rates for businesses and individuals; a personal tax simplification by increasing the standard deduction and family tax credits, but eliminating personal exemptions and making it less beneficial to itemize deductions; limiting deductions for state and local income taxes (SALT) and property taxes; further limiting the mortgage interest deduction; reducing the alternative minimum tax for individuals and eliminating it for corporations; reducing the number of estates impacted by the estate tax; and repealing the individual shared responsibility provision of the Affordable Care Act (ACA). The nonpartisan Congressional Budget Office (CBO) reported that, under the Act, individuals and pass-through entities like partnerships and S corporations would receive about $1,125billion in net benefits (i.e. net tax cuts offset by reduced healthcare subsidies) over 10 years, while corporations would receive around $320billion in benefits. The individual and pass-through tax cuts fade over time and become net tax increases starting in 2027 while the corporate tax cuts are permanent. This enabled the Senate to pass the bill with only 51 votes, without the need to defeat a filibuster, under the budget reconciliation process. Tax cuts were reflected in individual worker paychecks as early as February 2018 and with the corporate tax rate being reduced from 35% to 21%, numerous major American corporations announced across-the-board pay raises and bonuses for their workers, expanded benefits and programs, and investments in capital improvements.

Trump announced plans to withdraw the United States from the Paris Climate Agreement in June 2017. The agreement prevented any country from leaving less than three years after it began, so the United States had to wait until November 4, 2019, to officially start the withdrawal process. After a mandatory one-year waiting period, the country left on November 4, 2020.

On May 9, 2018, the Trump Administration withdrew from the Joint Comprehensive Plan of Action (JCPOA) (also known as the Iran Nuclear Deal) with Iran, and other Great Powers, over alleged violations of the agreement by the Iranians in regards toward their nuclear program.

The effects of the tax cuts resulted in the US economy stabilizing for a short period between early 2018 and September 2019. During that time, the 2018 midterm elections took place. The elections had the highest voter turnout of any midterm election since 1914; the Democratic Party regained majority control of the House of Representatives and the Republican Party expanded their majority in the Senate even though they received a minority of the popular vote.

In October 2019, the Federal Reserve announced that it would conduct a repurchase agreement operation to provide funds in the repo markets after the overnight lending rates spiked well above the Fed's target rate during the week of September 16.

At that time, the United States began to feel the effects of a global synchronized economic slowdown that began after global growth peaked in 2017 and industrial output started to decline in 2018. The International Monetary Fund blamed 'heightened trade and geopolitical tensions' as the main reason for the slowdown, citing Brexit and the China–United States trade war as primary reasons for slowdown in 2019, while other economists blamed liquidity issues.

On December 18, 2019, the House of Representatives brought forth two articles of impeachment (abuse of power and obstruction of Congress) against President Trump. Both articles were passed, impeaching Trump. Trump is the third President in American history to be impeached, after Andrew Johnson and Bill Clinton.

On December 20, 2019, Trump signed the 2020 National Defense Authorization Act, establishing the United States Space Force as the sixth armed service branch, with Air Force General John "Jay" Raymond, the head of Air Force Space Command and US Space Command, becoming the first Chief of Space Operations.

On January 3, 2020, President Trump responded to an attack on the US Embassy in Baghdad by ordering a drone strike against the Islamic Revolutionary Guard Corps's commanding general Qasem Soleimani and the Popular Mobilization Forces leader Abu Mahdi al-Muhandis at Baghdad International Airport. The incident sharply escalated a period of already strong tensions with Iran and lead to missile strikes on US military forces in Iraq on January 8, 2020. At the same time, Iranian military forces mistakenly shot down Ukraine International Airlines Flight 752, leading to domestic unrest and international condemnation.

In June 2020, the Supreme Court ruled against the Trump administration's order to rescind Deferred Action for Childhood Arrivals (DACA), saying the administration had not provided adequate reasoning under the Administrative Procedure Act. DACA is a United States immigration policy that allows some individuals with unlawful presence in the United States after being brought to the country as children to receive a renewable two-year period of deferred action from deportation and become eligible for a work permit in the US. To be eligible for the program, recipients cannot have felonies or serious misdemeanors on their records. Unlike the proposed DREAM Act, DACA does not provide a path to citizenship for recipients.

In September 2020, the death of Associate Justice Ruth Bader Ginsburg prompted President Trump to nominate Amy Coney Barrett to fill the Supreme Court vacancy. Barrett's nomination was controversial because of its proximity to the 2020 presidential election. The Senate voted to confirm Barrett in a partisan vote.

President Trump lost the 2020 presidential election to Joe Biden, who previously served as Vice President under President Barack Obama from 2009 to 2017. He became the first president to lose the popular vote in both elections contested, as well as the first president since George H. W. Bush's loss in 1992 to be defeated after his single term. Biden himself became the oldest person to win a United States presidential election and was the oldest president upon his inauguration. The 2020 presidential election also saw Kamala Harris become the first woman, and first person of African-American and Asian-American ancestry to be elected as Vice President of the United States. Trump attempted several efforts to overturn the election results and remain in office, none of which were successful.

The Biden administration 

Joe Biden was inaugurated on January 20, 2021. He is the oldest President at his inauguration at 78 years old beating his predecessor Donald Trump's record of 70. His vice president, Kamala Harris, was elected alongside Biden and is the first female vice president in American history.

On the first day of his presidency, Biden made an effort to revert President Trump's energy policy by restoring U.S. participation in the Paris Agreement and revoking the permit for the Keystone XL pipeline. He also halted funding for Trump's border wall, an expansion of the Mexican border wall. On his second day, he issued a series of executive orders to reduce the impact of COVID-19, including invoking the Defense Production Act of 1950, and set an early goal of achieving one hundred million COVID-19 vaccinations in the United States in his first 100 days.

Biden signed into law the American Rescue Plan Act of 2021; a $1.9 trillion stimulus bill that temporarily established expanded unemployment insurance and sent $1,400 stimulus checks to most Americans in response to continued economic pressure from COVID-19. He signed the bipartisan Infrastructure Investment and Jobs Act; a ten-year plan brokered by Biden alongside Democrats and Republicans in Congress, to invest in American roads, bridges, public transit, ports and broadband access. He appointed Ketanji Brown Jackson to the U.S. Supreme Court—the first Black woman to serve the court. Biden proposed a significant expansion of the U.S. social safety net through the Build Back Better Act, but those efforts, along with voting rights legislation, failed in Congress. However, in August 2022, Biden signed the Inflation Reduction Act of 2022, a domestic appropriations bill that included some of the provisions of the Build Back Better Act after the entire bill failed to pass. It included significant federal investment in climate and domestic clean energy production, tax credits for solar panels, electric cars and other home energy programs as well as a three-year extension of Affordable Care Act subsidies. From June 2022 Biden went on a string of legislative achievements; with the signing of The Bipartisan Safer Communities Act, the CHIPS and Science Act, a massive investment in the Semiconductor industry and manufacturing, Honoring our PACT Act of 2022, expansion of veterans healthcare and the Respect for Marriage Act, repealing the Defense of Marriage Act and codifying Same-sex and Interracial marriage.

In foreign policy, Biden completed the withdrawal of U.S. military forces from Afghanistan, declaring an end to nation-building efforts and shifting U.S. foreign policy toward strategic competition with China and, to a lesser extent, Russia. However, during the withdrawal, the Afghan government collapsed and the Taliban seized control, leading to Biden receiving bipartisan criticism. He responded to the 2022 Russian invasion of Ukraine by imposing sanctions on Russia as well as providing Ukraine with over $100 billion in combined military, economic, and humanitarian aid. Biden also approved a raid which led to the death of Abu Ibrahim al-Hashimi al-Qurashi, the leader of the Islamic State, and approved a drone strike which killed Ayman Al Zawahiri, leader of Al-Qaeda. Biden called for the expansion of NATO with the addition of Finland and Sweden, and rallied NATO allies in support of Ukraine.

Race

The mid-2010s saw the return of racial unrest in the country, as well as the continued growth of racial polarization and a deterioration of race relations in the US.

"A Post-Racial Nation"

Some Americans saw the presidential candidacy of Barack Obama, and his election in 2008 as the first black president of the United States, as a sign that the nation had, in fact, become post-racial. The conservative radio host Lou Dobbs, for example, said in November 2009, "We are now in a 21st-century post-partisan, post-racial society." Two months later, Chris Matthews, an MSNBC host, said of President Obama, "He is post-racial by all appearances. You know, I forgot he was black tonight for an hour."

However, public opinion on whether the United States is post-racial is itself divided starkly by race. In a Washington Post/ABC News poll conducted in December 2014, about 50% of white respondents said they believed that the justice system treats Americans of all races equally, but only 10% of African Americans said the same. In the spring of 2015, according to a Gallup poll, 13 percent of black Americans surveyed identified race relations as the most important problem the United States faces, compared with 4 percent of white Americans.

Arguments that the United States is not post-racial frequently emphasize the treatment of African Americans and other racial minorities in the criminal justice system and in interactions with the police. Killings of unarmed African Americans, often by police officers, have been widely publicized. In 2015, according to a study by The Guardian, police officers in the United States killed 7.13 black Americans per million, compared with 2.91 white Americans per million. Additionally:

Such killings had a marked effect on public perceptions of race relations in America. The 13 percent of black Americans who called race relations the most pressing problem in the United States in the spring 2015 Gallup poll dwarfed the 3 percent that Gallup reported at the beginning of 2014. And the percentage of white Americans who said race relations were the most important issue rose to 4 percent in 2015 from 1 percent in 2014.

In response to high-profile incidents such as the fatal shootings of Michael Brown, Aiyana Jones, Trayvon Martin, Laquan McDonald, Tamir Rice, and Walter Scott, and the death of Freddie Gray from a spinal-cord injury sustained in police custody, academics and journalists have denounced claims that America is post-racial. Ta-Nehisi Coates wrote in The Atlantic in 2015 that the phrase "post-racial" was "usually employed by talk-show hosts and news anchors looking to measure progress in the Obama era." And Anna Holmes wrote in The New York Times, "Chattel slavery and the legacies it left behind continue to shape American society. Sometimes it seems as if the desire for a 'post-racial' America is an attempt by white people to liberate themselves from the burden of having to deal with that legacy."

However, others argue that post-racial politics champions aggressive action to deliver economic opportunity and weed out police misconduct, without the divisive framing of racial identity.

Under this view, there is no claim that America has attained a fully post-racial society, however it is argued that news selection is skewed toward amplifying racial conflict, events demonstrating racial harmony are dismissed as non-newsworthy, and that such media conflict-bias acts to undermine trust and impede progress. Rather, any true measure of race relations must gauge the everyday daily experiences of Americans in interacting with people of differing backgrounds. An assumption is that the media will cherry-pick the most outrageous, racially-inflammatory events to cover no matter how infrequently they are occurring, and thus misreport progress toward a post-racial ideal. The central tenet of post-racial problem-solving practice is to seek the "alternative explanation" when conflict arises (presuming non-racist motives in others), in order to find common ground and creatively resolve the conflict. Examples of post-racial framing in attacking misconduct by the Criminal Justice System are video recording of all police-citizen interactions, creating a Citizens Review Board with investigative powers, and assigning an independent prosecutor. Or, in the educational sphere, creating charters, academies and school choice to turn around under-performing schools. The divide in public opinion on the status of race in America was reflected in reactions to the Black Lives Matter movement. In response to the "black lives matter" rallying cry, some people, including politicians, began using the phrase "all lives matter". After a sheriff's deputy in Harris County, Texas, was fatally shot while pumping gas in August, Sheriff Ron Hickman claimed that the rhetoric of Black Lives Matter activists had contributed to the killing and said, "We’ve heard 'black lives matter'. All lives matter. Well, cops’ lives matter, too. So why don't we just drop the qualifier and just say 'lives matter', and take that to the bank.' Supporters of the Black Lives Matter movement criticized the "all lives matter" phrase, arguing that it minimized the systemic threats faced by African Americans. President Obama said in October, "There is a specific problem that is happening in the African-American community that's not happening in other communities." Andrew Rosenthal wrote, similarly, in The New York Times, "The point of 'Black Lives Matter' is that the lives of African-Americans have come under special and deadly threat since before the birth of this country."

Evidence of continued racial divisions in the United States can also be found in demographics. For instance, African Americans account for less than 15 percent of the total population of Michigan, but more than 82 percent of the population of the state's largest city, Detroit — and Detroit, like many cities whose residents are predominantly black, has "self-segregated schools, dwindling tax bases and decaying public services".

African Americans and law enforcement

Even after the end of the crack epidemic, there remained a large disparity in crime rates between black people and whites, with black people accounting for 28% of arrests in 2013; over 50% of homicides and robberies where the race of the offender was known were committed by black suspects. As most crime is intraracial, most of their victims were black as well, and crime remained concentrated within black communities. Due to high crime rates, many inner city areas were heavily policed, often by police forces drawn from the population of the greater urban area rather than the local, primarily black, population, resulting in many black people feeling that they were being discriminated against by law enforcement. By 2009, black people accounted for 39.4% of the prison population in the United States. The incarceration rate of black males was over six times higher than that of white males, with a rate of 4,749 per 100,000 US residents.

In August 2014, Darren Wilson, a white policeman in Ferguson, Missouri shot and killed Michael Brown, an 18-year-old unarmed black man who had robbed a nearby convenience store fifteen minutes earlier. While a grand jury investigation found that Wilson had acted in self-defense after Brown attacked him on two separate occasions, locals hostile to the police claimed that Brown had been gunned down while surrendering. Racial tensions in Ferguson between the mainly black population and mainly white police force led to both peaceful protests and riots, and several buildings were looted and set on fire. In response, the Ferguson Police Department deployed military-grade riot gear and riot control weaponry to disperse crowds and maintain order. Further protests erupted after the death of Eric Garner, a 43-year-old black resident of Staten Island, New York who died after being put in a nineteen-second long chokehold by New York City Police Department officer Daniel Pantaleo while resisting arrest. Garner was being investigated by the NYPD under suspicion of illegally selling cigarettes. Pantaleo's acquittal by a grand jury in December led to nationwide protests by a movement which came to call itself Black Lives Matter.

As media coverage of police shootings intensified, protests erupted in the wake of the July 5, 2016 shooting of Alton Sterling in Baton Rouge, Louisiana, and the July 6 shooting of Philando Castile in Falcon Heights, Minnesota. On July 7, towards the end of one of these protests in Dallas, Texas, Micah Xavier Johnson ambushed and fired upon a group of police officers, killing five officers and injuring nine others. Two civilians were also wounded. Johnson was an Army Reserve Afghan War veteran who was reportedly angry over police shootings of black men and stated that he wanted to kill white people, especially white police officers. Following the shooting, Johnson fled inside a building on the campus of El Centro College. Police followed him there, and a standoff ensued. In the early hours of July 8, police killed Johnson with a bomb attached to a remote control bomb disposal robot. It was the first time US law enforcement used a robot to kill a suspect. The shooting was the deadliest incident for US law enforcement officers since the September 11 attacks in 2001 and saw a massive uprising of public support for US police officers in the form of the Blue Lives Matter movement.

The George Floyd protests and riots against police brutality that began as local protests in the Minneapolis–Saint Paul metropolitan area of Minnesota before spreading throughout the United States and then worldwide. The protests began in Minneapolis on May 26, 2020, following the murder of George Floyd during an arrest the previous day. Minneapolis Police Department officer Derek Chauvin knelt on Floyd's neck for over nine minutes, asphyxiating him, with the help of three other police. Floyd had been handcuffed and pinned to the ground. Protests quickly spread across the United States and internationally in support of Black Lives Matter.

At least twelve major cities declared a curfew on the evening of Saturday, May 30, and as of June 2, governors in 24 states and Washington, D.C, had called in the National Guard, with over 17,000 troops activated.

Unite the Right rally

On August 13, 2017, Trump condemned violence "on many sides" after a gathering of hundreds of white nationalists in Charlottesville, Virginia, the previous day (August 12) turned deadly. A white supremacist drove a car into a crowd of counter-protesters, killing one woman, Heather Heyer, and injuring 19 others. According to Attorney General Jeff Sessions, that action met the definition of domestic terrorism. During the rally there had been other violence, as some counter-protesters charged at the white nationalists with swinging clubs and mace, throwing bottles, rocks, and paint. Trump did not expressly mention Neo-Nazis, white supremacists, or the alt-right movement in his remarks on August 13, but the following day (August 14) he did denounce white supremacists as he had done as a candidate the previous year. He condemned "the KKK, neo-Nazis, white supremacists, and other hate groups". Then the next day (August 15), he again blamed "both sides".
 
Many Republican and Democratic elected officials condemned the violence and hatred of white nationalists, neo-Nazis and alt-right activists. Trump came under criticism from world leaders and politicians, as well as a variety of religious groups and anti-hate organizations for his remarks, which were seen as muted and equivocal. The New York Times reported that Trump "was the only national political figure to spread blame for the 'hatred, bigotry and violence' that resulted in the death of one person to 'many sides, and said that Trump had "buoyed the white nationalist movement on Tuesday as no president has done in generations". White nationalist groups felt "emboldened" after the rally and planned additional demonstrations.

The End Domestic Terrorism rally (sometimes referred to by the slogan "Better Dead Than Red") was a Proud Boys demonstration held in Portland, Oregon, on August 17, 2019. The event received national attention.

COVID-19 pandemic

In January 2020, the first cases of COVID-19 were detected in the United States with the first death occurring on February 6. By February 2, the Trump administration restricted travel to and from China. On March 11, the WHO declared the virus to be a pandemic. In March, many state and local governments imposed "stay at home" orders to slow the spread of the virus, with the goal of reducing patient overload in hospitals. By March 26, New York Times data showed the United States to have the highest number of known cases of any country. By March 27, the country had reported over 100,000 cases. On April 2, at President Trump's direction, the Centers for Medicare & Medicaid Services (CMS) and CDC ordered additional preventive guidelines to the long-term care facility industry. On April 11, the U.S. death toll became the highest in the world when the number of deaths reached 20,000, surpassing that of Italy. On April 19, the CMS added new regulations requiring nursing homes to inform residents, their families and representatives, of COVID-19 cases in their facilities. On April 28, the total number of confirmed cases across the country surpassed 1million. By May 2020, 100,000 Americans had died with COVID-19. This corresponded with a relaxing of lockdown restrictions, leading to a surge of cases in July.

National, state, and local elections were impacted as a result of the pandemic. Many primary elections scheduled in March and April were postponed and sometimes cancelled. Voting by mail was also widely used as an alternative, with restrictions initially being relaxed to support the influx of mail voters. Campaign events were also altered, with Democratic candidate Joe Biden suspending many in-person rallies. President Trump continued with in-person rallies, receiving widespread criticism. An outbreak at the White House resulted in at least 48 people testing positive including President Trump and First Lady Melania Trump. This resulted in the cancellation of a scheduled presidential debate between Trump and Biden.

COVID-19 vaccines began to be developed quickly after the pandemic began. In December, the FDA granted emergency use authorization for the Pfizer-BioNTech vaccine and the Moderna vaccine, followed shortly after by the Janssen COVID-19 vaccine. Booster doses were later approved for all 3 vaccines to improve immunity over time. Many companies, universities, and state governments began giving bonuses and rewards in mid-2021 to encourage higher vaccine rates. Localities such as New York City, private companies such as United Airlines, and organizations such as the US Army issued vaccine mandates. This was accompanied by an executive order by Biden to enforce a vaccine requirement for large companies, although this was later blocked by the Supreme Court.

By June 2021, the Delta Variant caused a surge in COVID-19 cases, hospitalizations, and deaths, especially among those not vaccinated. By August, the Delta Variant accounted for 99% of all cases of COVID-19, with the country surpassing 35 million cases. In September, the country neared 700,000 deaths, becoming the deadliest pandemic in US history. The Omicron Variant became widespread by January 2022, causing a massive increase in cases, averaging over 1,000,000 new cases daily.

By February and March 2022, all 50 states and many localities began to lift restrictions and mask mandates. In his 2022 State of the Union Address, President Biden announced a new national strategy against the pandemic, including an increased emphasis on antiviral pills and combating new variants. On April 18, 2022, the federal transportation mask mandate, which had been extended to May 3 by the Biden administration on the advice of the CDC, was ended nationwide by U.S. District Judge Kathryn Kimball Mizelle, a Trump-appointed federal judge in Florida. Cases and deaths decreased throughout 2022, leading to President Biden stating his belief in a September interview that the COVID-19 pandemic was "over" in the United States, a statement which received backlash from many in the medical community.

The impact of the pandemic was widespread across social and economic sectors. COVID-19 lockdowns contributed to mass changes in social behavior for Americans. COVID-19 also had immediate consequences for prison populations, public transport, and cultural events such as sports. School closures also contributed to a learning gap for students as well as a rise in mental health concerns. Nearly all schools and universities transitioned to a completely online or hybrid method of teaching in spring 2020.  Racial disparities were also exasperated by the pandemic, with a disproportionate number of cases being observed amongst Black and Latino populations. These groups were also more likely to die from COVID-19 and less likely to have received a vaccine. Native American reservations were also hit particularly hard, with lack of access to vaccines contributing to higher cases. Anti-Asian racism and xenophobia was also widely reported due to perceived Chinese faulthood for the virus. The economy entered a recession following an initial stock market crash in February 2020. National unemployment rose to a high of 14.7% in April 2020. Long lasting economic effects continued throughout the early 2020s resulting in supply-chain issues and a period of inflation.

See also

 Presidency of George W. Bush
 Presidency of Barack Obama
 Presidency of Donald Trump
 Presidency of Joe Biden
 Outline of United States history
 Timeline of United States history (2010–present)
 Timeline of modern American conservatism
 List of federal political scandals in the United States
 :Category:2000s in the United States
 :Category:2010s in the United States
 :Category:2020s in the United States

References

Further reading

 Alter, Jonathan. The Promise: President Obama, Year One (2010) table of contents, excerpt, search
 Barone, Michael. The Almanac of American Politics 2020: The Senators, the Representatives and the Governors: Their Records and Election Results, Their States and Districts (2019), 2100 pp, covers all the live politicians with elaborate detail; this series has appeared every two years since 1975
 The Almanac of American Politics 2022 (2021), for Congress elected in 2020
  Pulitzer Prize winning critic evaluates 150 recent books on Trump Administration.
 Watson, Robert P., ed. The Obama Presidency: A Preliminary Assessment (State University of New York Press; 2012) 443 pages; essays by scholars
 Whipple, Chris. The Fight of His Life: Inside Joe Biden's White House (Scribner, 2023)excerpt
 Zelizer, Julian E. ed. The Presidency of Barack Obama: A First Historical Assessment (2018) excerpt
 Zelizer, Julian E. ed. The Presidency of Donald J. Trump: A First Historical Assessment (2022) excerpt

External links
 
 

United States
21st century in the United States